Lewis County is a county located in the U.S. state of Kentucky. Its county seat is Vanceburg.

History
The area presently bounded by Kentucky state lines was a part of the U.S. State of Virginia, known as Kentucky County when the British colonies separated themselves in the American Revolutionary War. In 1780, the Virginia legislature divided the previous Kentucky County into three smaller units: Fayette, Jefferson, and Lincoln. In 1791, this area was separated into the State of Kentucky; it became effective on June 1, 1792. From that time, the original three counties were divided several times. A portion of Fayette County was split off as Bourbon County in 1785; a portion of Bourbon was split off as Mason County in 1788; in 1806 the present Lewis County was split off from Mason. The new county was named for Meriwether Lewis.

The county's hilly country, heavily forested, has produced some of the nation's best oak lumber. Lumbering has been the county's principal economic activity from the start.

The county's elevation ranges from 485 to 1400 feet above sea level.

Geography
The county's northern border with Ohio is formed by the Ohio River. Its border with the river is the longest of all the Kentucky counties.

Adjacent counties
 Adams County, Ohio  (north)
 Scioto County, Ohio  (northeast)
 Greenup County  (east)
 Carter County  (southeast)
 Rowan County  (south)
 Fleming County  (southwest)
 Mason County  (west)

National protected area
 Ohio River Islands National Wildlife Refuge (part)

Demographics

As of the census of 2000, there were 14,092 people, 5,422 households, and 4,050 families residing in the county. The racial makeup of the county was 98.92% White, 0.21% Black or African American, 0.21% Native American, 0.03% Asian, 0.09% from other races, and 0.55% from two or more races. 0.44% of the population were Hispanic or Latino of any race.

There were 5,422 households, out of which 35.10% had children under the age of 18 living with them, 60.40% were married couples living together, 9.70% had a female householder with no husband present, and 25.30% were non-families. 22.50% of all households were made up of individuals, and 10.00% had someone living alone who was 65 years of age or older. The average household size was 2.56 and the average family size was 2.98.

In the county, the population was spread out, with 25.30% under the age of 18, 9.10% from 18 to 24, 29.40% from 25 to 44, 23.70% from 45 to 64, and 12.50% who were 65 years of age or older. The median age was 36 years. For every 100 females, there were 99.00 males. For every 100 females age 18 and over, there were 97.00 males.

The median income for a household in the county was $22,208, and the median income for a family was $26,109. Males had a median income of $25,522 versus $18,764 for females. The per capita income for the county was $12,031. About 23.50% of families and 28.50% of the population were below the poverty line, including 36.40% of those under age 18 and 21.30% of those age 65 or over.

Over forty percent of this county gets some kind of government benefit.

Politics
Lewis County is one of the most Republican leaning counties in Kentucky. The last Democrat to win the county in a presidential election was Samuel J. Tilden in 1876.

Education

The residents of Lewis County are served by the Lewis County Schools school district. There are 4 elementary schools within the county, 1 middle school, and 1 high school. The elementary schools are as follows: Lewis County Central Elementary, located in Vanceburg, Garrison Elementary, located east of Vanceburg in the town of Garrison, Tollesboro Elementary, located west of Vanceburg in the town of Tollesboro, and Laurel Elementary, located south east of Vanceburg in the Laurel area of Lewis County. Upon entering 7th grade all 7th grade students attend Lewis County Middle School located west of Vanceburg on KY 10. LCMS hosts two grade levels, 7th and 8th. Upon completing 8th grade students attend Lewis County High School, which sets adjacent to the middle school. LCHS hosts grades 9-12 and was a nationally distinguished school in 2015, 2016, and 2018. Lewis County Middle School and Lewis County High School are located west of Vanceburg on KY 10, the AA Highway.

Elementary Schools:
 Lewis County Central Elementary School, Vanceburg. Mascot-Lions, Colors-Royal blue, red, and white.
 Garrison Elementary School, Garrison. Mascot-Patriots, Colors-Red, black, and white.
 Tollesboro Elementary School, Tollesboro. Mascot-Wildcats, Colors-Royal blue, yellow, and white.
 Laurel Elementary School, Laurel. Mascot-Bombers, Colors-Kelly green and white.

Middle Schools:
 Lewis County Middle School, Vanceburg. Mascot-Lions, Colors-Royal blue, red, and white.

High Schools:
 Lewis County High School, Vanceburg. Mascot-Lions, Colors-Royal blue, red, and white.
Closed Schools:
 Tollesboro High School, Tollesboro. Closed in 1994 due to low enrollment numbers and loss of state funding. Tollesboro High students then had to attend Lewis County High School. This was an issue that caused controversy within the county as Tollesboro High School and Lewis County High School had a long-standing, bitter rivalry with one another. Tollesboro officials and residents claimed that the closure of the school by the Lewis County Board of Education was not justified. Some residents went as far as to send their children to the schools of surrounding counties, such as Mason Co. and Fleming Co. However, with time the controversy died down and is now non-existent. The main school building which housed offices, class rooms, etc. as well as the Field Hall, which contained the gymnasium for the school still stand today. They set just off of KY Route 57 near the intersection with old highway 10. The building was later used as the Tollesboro Christian Academy, however that organization was short lived and is now defunct.
 Laurel High School, Laurel. The building which housed the Laurel High School burned in the late 1930s. The building was made of local stone which was largely undamaged by the fire, so the exterior of the building could have been reused. However, the interior was burnt beyond repair. High School students of the Laurel area then had to attend Lewis County High School, where they still go to this day. The building sat just off of the intersection of KY Route 59 and highway 1068 (near Laurel Point). The remnants of the building are still visible today.

Communities

Cities
 Concord
 Vanceburg (County Seat)

Census-designated place
 Garrison

Other unincorporated places

 Alburn
 Awe
 Black Oak
 Beechy Creek
 Buena Vista
 Burtonville
 Cabin Creek
 Camp Dix
 Carrs
 Charters
 Clarksburg (County Seat 1809–1863)
 Cottageville
 Covedale
 Crum
 Emerson
 Epworth
 Esculapia Springs
 Fearis
 Firebrick
 Fruit
 Glenn
 Glenn Springs (Earlier known as McCormick's Spring)
 Gun Powder Gap
 Harris
 Head of Grassy
 Heselton
 Irwin
 Jacktown
 Kinniconick
 Kirkville
 Laurel
 Libbie
 Martin
 McDowell Creek
 McKenzie
 Montgomery Creek
 Nashtown
 Noah
 Oak Ridge
 Pence
 Petersville
 Poplar Flat   (County Seat 1806–1809)
 Quicks Run
 Randville
 Records
 Rexton
 Ribolt
 Rugless
 Saint Paul
 Salt Lick
 Sand Hill
 Stricklett
 Sullivan
 Tannery
 Teutonia
 Thor
 Tollesboro
 Trinity (Trinity Station)
 Upper Bruce
 Valley
 Wadsworth

Notable people
 James Baird (1873-1953) - Quarterback at the University of Michigan 1892–1895. After graduation served as an Assistant Coach for the football program from 1897 to 1898. Later as a Civil Engineer, his construction company executed the building of prominent buildings such as the Lincoln Memorial and Tomb of the Unknown Soldier.
 Charles A. Baird (1870-1944) - University of Michigan's first Athletic Director from 1898 to 1909. Hired legendary coach Fielding H. Yost. Oversaw construction of Ferry Field. Older brother of James Baird. 
 Thomas Marshall (1793–1853) – United States Army general of the Mexican–American War.
 The founder of "Pillar of Fire Church" and KKK advocate Alma Bridwell White was born there.
 Thomas Massie, Current Congressman, Kentucky's 4th Congressional District
 Ralph Davis, (Ralph E. Davis Jr.) University of Cincinnati Basketball. Started on two NCAA Final Four teams for the Bearcats. Went on to play professional basketball in the American Basketball Association (ABA) for the Cincinnati Royals, a Pre-NBA merger franchise which is now the Sacramento Kings.
 Faith Esham, (b. 1948) Famous opera performer and recitalist. Voice Professor at Westminster Choir College of Rider University since 2000. 
 Thomas H. Paynter, United States Senator 1907-1913
 George M. Thomas (American politician), (November 23, 1828 – January 7, 1914) Member of the U.S. House of Representatives from Kentucky's 9th district: In office March 4, 1887 – March 3, 1889. Member of the Kentucky House of Representatives: In office 1859–1863, 1872–1873. Commonwealth's Attorney for the tenth judicial district 1862–1868. Was elected Lewis county judge in 1868. Republican candidate for Lieutenant Governor of Kentucky in 1871. Circuit Judge of the fourteenth judicial district from 1874 to 1880 and United States District Attorney from 1881 to 1885. Elected as a Republican to the Fiftieth Congress (March 4, 1887 – March 3, 1889). Was appointed Solicitor of Internal Revenue by President William McKinley on May 20, 1897, and served until May 31, 1901.

See also
 National Register of Historic Places listings in Lewis County, Kentucky

References

External links

 The Kentucky Highlands Project
 Lewis County website
 Lewis County Tourism

 
Kentucky counties
Kentucky counties on the Ohio River
Maysville, Kentucky micropolitan area
1806 establishments in Kentucky
Populated places established in 1806
Counties of Appalachia